Didi Lilo is a daba (small town) in the country of Georgia, located on the Iori Plateau on the outskirts of Tbilisi. It has a population of around 2,400. In 1974, it was granted the status of city. It is a rural village with a small agricultural industry. The town is best known for being the birthplace of some members of Joseph Stalin's family, including Stalin's father Besarion Jughashvili.

See also
 Kvemo Kartli

References

Populated places in Tbilisi